The A6 is a highway in Zimbabwe running from the Beitbridge border with South Africa, through Gwanda, to Bulawayo. It is part of the R9 Route, which links Beitbridge with Victoria Falls.

The A6 Highway runs from Bulawayo through Esigodini, Mulungwane, Mbalabala, Gwanda, West Nicholson, Makado, Mazunga to Beitbridge.

Junctions

There is one major junction. The A9 Road (Zimbabwe) to Mutare via Masvingo branches east at Mbalabala just past the 61 km peg (61.3 km).  (71 km from Bulawayo city centre)

See also 
 Trans-African Highway network
 R2 Highway
 R1 Highway
 A8 Highway

References

Roads in Zimbabwe